Percy Schmeiser (5 January 193113 October 2020) was a Canadian businessman, farmer, and politician. In 1954, he took over the operations of the family owned farm, gas station, and farm equipment dealership. He renamed the farm equipment dealership Schmeiser's Garage and added a second farm equipment dealership in Humboldt, Saskatchewan (Central Farm Sales) in 1986 and oversaw their operations until their sale in 2003.

He became an international symbol and spokesperson for independent farmers' rights and the regulation of transgenic crops during his protracted legal battle with multinational agrichemical company Monsanto.  While farming, he specialized in breeding and growing canola, field peas, mustard, and wheat. He is the subject of the 2009 film David Versus Monsanto and the 2020 film Percy.

Monsanto v. Schmeiser

In 1997, Schmeiser found volunteer canola plants and a number of weeds growing along the road in one of his fields. He testified that he sprayed these weeds in what is commonly known as a "spring burn." This practice eliminates weeds prior to planting of the crop, as weeds take valuable moisture away from the crop during germination. Schmeiser surprisingly found that a number of these volunteer canola plants had survived after the spring burn, potentially meaning they had developed a resistance to chemicals. As it was only the second year that Roundup Ready canola was available for use, this was highly unusual. He testified that his intention all along was to plant canola in that field as it was fallow (not planted the year before), as it was part of his crop rotation to prevent disease. In seeking the potential of the largest return, he typically planted canola in a fallow field. When he then harvested that crop approximately 90 days later, the thought that any other part of his field may be contaminated with Roundup Ready canola was the furthest thing from his mind.

Following farmers' long standing rights to save and use their own seed, Schmeiser saved all of canola from that and his other fields and kept a small amount aside for planting in 1998. The rest of his canola was sold to a nearby processing plant. Without Schmeiser's permission or knowledge, Monsanto trespassed onto his fields and took samples of his canola plants during the first stage of germination. Monsanto then approached him to pay a "technology use fee" for using Monsanto's patented technology without a license. Schmeiser refused, stating that there was no intent to use Monsanto's product, that he didn't spray his fields with Roundup (the only benefit of Roundup Ready canola) and claimed that the actual seed was his because it was grown on his land. After demands and threats, Monsanto sued Schmeiser for patent infringement on August 6, 1998.

For the next several years, the case traveled through the Canadian court system. The initial focus of Monsanto's action was that they were seeking $15/acre (1030acres X $15. = $15k) plus costs, as they claimed Schmeiser had Monsanto's technology in his possession without paying for it, even though the court found that Schmeiser did not spray any of his canola with Roundup. Monsanto stated that this was immaterial; as he had their technology on his fields. Over time, Monsanto changed their approach that the case was done on principle, not financial; solely that they had a valid patent, and they would use a valid patent to sue other farmers.

Meanwhile, Schmeiser became a popular figure among those opposed to genetic engineering. He accepted speaking engagements around the world. Schmeiser continued to face threats and harassment from Robertson Investigations; a firm hired by Monsanto to enforce their patent. Ultimately, in a split decision from the Supreme Court of Canada, Schmeiser won a 9–0 ruling that he did not have to pay Monsanto their technology-use fee, damages, or costs. The court ruled that Schmeiser did not receive any benefit from Monsanto's technology, but still ruled in a 5–4 decision that Monsanto had a valid patent, and that unintentional possession didn't matter, thus Schmeiser infringed on the patent.

A film about Schmeiser's fight with Monsanto, with Christopher Walken as Schmeiser, was released the week before Schmeiser's death on October 13, 2020.

Schmeiser v. Monsanto 
On August 11, 1999, Schmeiser filed a separate lawsuit against Monsanto for ten million dollars for "libel, trespass, and contamination of his fields with Roundup Ready Canola". As of 2007, Schmeiser had not started to prosecute that lawsuit.

In 2002 Schmeiser's wife, Louise Schmeiser, filed suit against Monsanto for $140 plus costs to remove contamination of her organic garden with volunteer GM canola; the case was dismissed.

Schmeiser again discovered Roundup Ready Canola growing in his fields in 2005, even though canola had not been planted in that particular field since 1998.  He contacted Monsanto to have the company remove it, but when Monsanto conditioned doing so on Schmeiser signing a confidentiality agreement and a release from litigation, Schmeiser had the cleanup done and billed Monsanto for the $660 cost.  When Monsanto refused to pay, Schmeiser sued in small claims court. On March 19, 2008 Monsanto settled out of court, paying the $660 without stipulation.

Other accomplishments 
Schmeiser spent over 40 years in various political roles and community service. He served as mayor of Bruno from 1966 to 1983, and also as member of the Legislative Assembly of Saskatchewan for the Watrous constituency for the Liberal Party of Saskatchewan from 1967 to 1971. Schmeiser was elected again as a town Councillor of Bruno in 2003 and served as the deputy mayor until 2009.

While serving in the provincial legislature from 1967 to 1971, Schmeiser was on the MLA committee that selected Saskatchewan's flag.

Schmeiser was the recipient of the Merit Award for Dealer of the Year in 1984 by the Saskatchewan Manitoba Implement Dealers Association. He was appointed to Saskatchewan's Real Estate Commission in 1993 and served until 1999. In 2000, he received the Mahatma Gandhi Award for working for the good of society. In 2007, Percy Schmeiser and Louise Schmeiser were named winners of the Right Livelihood Award (often referred to as the alternative Nobel Prize):

Death
Schmeiser died on October 13, 2020 at the age of 89 from Parkinson's disease.

Quotes

In film
 The Future of Food – 2004
 GMO Monsanto vs Percy Schmeiser – 2005
 Percy Schmeiser : David versus Monsanto – 2009
 Seeds of Death: Unveiling the Lies of GMOs – 2012
 Seeds of Freedom – 2012
 Percy – 2020

References

Further reading

External links

 
 Timeline of Percy Schmeiser v. Monsanto Company case
 Appeal ruling, Federal Court of Appeal
 Percy Schmeiser speaks at Biodemocracy – 51 minutes
 

1931 births
2020 deaths
Canadian activists
Canadian people of German descent
Farmers from Saskatchewan
Mayors of places in Saskatchewan
Saskatchewan Liberal Party MLAs
Neurological disease deaths in Canada
Deaths from Parkinson's disease